Velike Dole is a small settlement in the Municipality of Trebnje in eastern Slovenia. It lies on the regional road leading south from Zagorica pri Velikem Gabru to Žužemberk. The area is part of the historical region of Lower Carniola. The municipality is now included in the Southeast Slovenia Statistical Region.

References

External links
Velike Dole at Geopedia

Populated places in the Municipality of Trebnje